Benedict Delisle Burns  (1915–2001) was a neurophysiologist and a pioneer of operations research and of the statistical analysis of neuronal activity.

He studied at Tübingen University, and King's College Cambridge. He worked at  National Institute for Medical Research (NIMR), and McGill University.

He was elected Fellow of the Royal Society in 1968.

References

1915 births
2001 deaths
Fellows of the Royal Society
Neurophysiologists